Eamonn Keane is an Irish primary school teacher from Louisburgh, County Mayo who specialises in endurance weightlifting.

Media coverage
His bench press record is mentioned in the 2005 edition of Guinness World Records. and later mentioned in the 2008 book World's Stupidest Athletes by Barb Karg and Rick Sutherland and in the 2013 book Weight Lifting and Weight Training by Noah Daniels.

Eamonn was the subject of a Cogar documentary called Éamonn Ó Cathain – An Fear Iarainn on Ireland's Irish Language Station TG4 released 6 November 2011. In the documentary, Eamonn goes in search of his ultimate goal in weightlifting by attempting to become the only man ever to achieve a career "grand slam" of world records in 12 different endurance weightlifting disciplines.

His 13th record was ratified in December 2011.

One of his records was included in Guinness World Records 2012, mentioning his arm-curled weight in an hour.

Four of his records were included in Guinness World Records 2013, pertaining to the most weighted lifted in an hour in the bench press, barbell row, dumbbell row and lateral raise.

He is also included in the 2015 edition.

Guinness World Records

 
He has also previously held world weightlifting records in at least 4 other categories.

References

Irish schoolteachers
Irish male weightlifters
Living people
World record holders in weightlifting
Sportspeople from County Mayo
Year of birth missing (living people)